Novemberinte Nashtam is a 1982 Malayalam-language romantic drama film written and directed by P. Padmarajan. It stars Madhavi, Ramachandran, Prathap Pothan and Surekha.

Plot
The film is about a girl's emotional turmoil after a breakup and her ever supportive brother and how they try to get through the difficult period.

Cast
 Madhavi as Meera
 Ramachandran as Balu, Meera's brother
 Prathap Pothan as Das, Meera's lover
 Surekha as Ambika, Balu's wife
 Nalini as Rekha, Meera's friend
 Bharath Gopi as Meera's father
 Thodupuzha Vasanthi

Soundtrack
The music was composed by M. G. Radhakrishnan and K. C. Varghese Kunnamkulam with lyrics by Poovachal Khader.

Production
The film was produced by Abbas Malayil under the banner of Charasma Films. He had, in 1979, produced the film Neelathamara, which was directed by Yusufali Kechery and written by M. T. Vasudevan Nair. Abbas returned to film production after three decades, with the film Parayan Baaki Vechathu (2013).

Padmarajan gave voice to Das, the character played by Prathap Pothan.

References

External links 
 
 Novemberinte Nashtam at the Malayalam Movie Database
 Novemberinte Nashtam at Cinamalayalam.net
  ReLook: Novemberinte Nashtam at Movieraga.com

1982 films
1980s Malayalam-language films
Films with screenplays by Padmarajan
Films directed by Padmarajan
Indian romantic drama films
1982 romantic drama films